"Run the Red Light" is the third single by Australian rock group British India, taken from their debut album Guillotine (2007). 

It debuted on the Australian ARIA Singles Chart at number fifty for the week beginning 26 November 2007.

Track listing

Charts

Release history

See also

 2007 in music
 Music of Australia

References

2007 singles
British India (band) songs
Song recordings produced by Harry Vanda
2006 songs